

The Skyfox Aviation Skyfox is an Australian ultralight cabin monoplane designed by Skyfox Aviation of Queensland and first flown in 1989. Originally sold as an ultralight it was later produced for general aviation use.

Design and development
The Skyfox is a high-wing braced monoplane with a conventional tailwheel landing gear with a fixed tailwheel. It has a welded steel fuselage with fabric covering. The wings can be folded when not in use along the side of the fuselage.

Originally built to meet Australian ultralight regulations the latter CA-25 is built to JAR-VLA rules.

Variants
CA-21
Volkswagen-engined variant, production ended in 1991
CA-22
Ultralight variant with a Rotax 912 engine.
CA-25 Impala
General aviation variant
CA-25N Gazelle
CA-25 with nosewheel landing gear.

Specifications (CA-25)

References

Notes

Bibliography

External links 

1980s Australian ultralight aircraft